Harewood and Beechwood, also known as Woods School, are two historic homes located about four miles apart in Middletown Township, Bucks County, Pennsylvania. Harewood was originally built about 1788 as a farmhouse.  The original structure is located behind the main house constructed in 1906.  Harewood is an irregularly shaped, multi-level dwelling with a five-story main section. The main section has a broken-hipped roof and features Palladian windows. Beechwood was built in 1853, and is a large -story, fieldstone dwelling with a gable roof. It has a two-story, stuccoed stone rear addition.  Both houses were built as country mansions and later acquired as a school for handicapped children known as the Woods School.  Harewood was acquired in 1924 and Beechwood in 1944.

It was added to the National Register of Historic Places in 1980.

References

External links
 Richard Wolbers; Friends to Save Beechwood (Bryn Mawr, Pa.); Frens and Frens, LLC, Restoration Architects (West Chester, Pa.); E. Allen Reeves, Inc. (2003).The restoration of Beechwood: Bryn Mawr, Pa. (DVD)	Bryn Mawr, Pa.: Friends to Save Beechwood.

Houses on the National Register of Historic Places in Pennsylvania
1788 establishments in Pennsylvania
Houses in Bucks County, Pennsylvania
National Register of Historic Places in Bucks County, Pennsylvania